Axis Sally was the generic nickname given to women radio personalities who broadcast English-language propaganda on behalf of the European Axis Powers during World War II. These included:

Mildred Gillars, a German-American who broadcast for Germany. She was "the first woman in US history to be convicted of treason" by the United States and "on 8 March 1949 was sentenced to ten to thirty years' imprisonment."
Rita Zucca, an Italian-American who broadcast for Italy.

On their radio shows, the two Axis Sally personalities would typically alternate between swing music and propaganda messages aimed at American troops. These messages would emphasize the value of surrender, stoke fears that soldiers' wives and girlfriends were cheating on them, and point out that the Axis powers knew their locations. American soldiers listened to Gillars' broadcasts for the entertaining music even as they found her attempts at propaganda "laughable".

See also 
 Lord Haw-Haw
 Tokyo Rose
 Constance Drexel

References

External links
http://www.historynet.com/axis-sally.htm 
http://www.findingdulcinea.com/news/on-this-day/March-April-08/On-this-day---Axis-Sally--Convicted-of-Treason.html 
http://factorialist.com/axis-sally-nazi-fame/

Nazi propaganda radio
German radio presenters
German women radio presenters
Italian radio presenters
Italian women radio presenters
Collective pseudonyms
Race-related controversies in radio
Nicknames
Nicknames in radio